The 1938 Arkansas Razorbacks football team represented the University of Arkansas in the Southwest Conference (SWC) during the 1938 college football season. In their tenth year under head coach Fred Thomsen, the Razorbacks compiled a 2–7–1 record (1–5 against SWC opponents), finished in a tie for last place in the SWC, and still outscored their opponents by a combined total of 128 to 125.

During the 1938 season, the Razorbacks relocated from The Hill, an on-campus 300-seat stadium used since 1901, and began play in Bailey Stadium, known today as Donald W. Reynolds Razorback Stadium. The stadium was initially known as University Stadium, but was quickly renamed Bailey Stadium in honor of then-Arkansas governor Carl Edward Bailey. The Hill was demolished and Mullins Library was placed on the old site.

Schedule

References

Arkansas
Arkansas Razorbacks football seasons
Arkansas Razorbacks football